The Pesceana is a right tributary of the river Olt in Romania. It discharges into the Olt in Drăgășani.

References

Rivers of Romania
Rivers of Vâlcea County